The Ma On Shan line was a rapid transit line that formed part of the Mass Transit Railway (MTR) system in Hong Kong. Coloured brown on the MTR map, the line acted as a branch of the East Rail line that connects the new towns of Sha Tin and Ma On Shan in the northeastern New Territories.

The railway was one of three built by the Kowloon-Canton Railway Corporation (KCRC), which named it as Ma On Shan Rail (abbreviated as ). Since KCRC's merger of operations with the MTR Corporation on 2 December 2007, the line has been operated as part of the MTR network. The line was integrated into the Tuen Ma line Phase 1 on 14 February 2020 following the partial opening of the Sha Tin to Central Link.

Overview and current status

Construction of the Ma On Shan line began on 12 February 2001 and it fully opened for service on 21 December 2004, 3 days earlier than the proposed opening date. KCRC estimated the construction costs to be HK$10 billion. Over a thousand passengers took the first train from Tai Wai on the first day of service. Since then, the usage of buses and taxis in the area decreased by as much as 50%. It was reported that some bus routes operated by KMB saw a decrease of ridership by one-third in just a few days.

Since the early planning stages, the Ma On Shan line was designed to be capable of joining with the West Rail line. Under Phase 1 the Sha Tin to Central Link project, the Ma On Shan line would be extended from Tai Wai station to Hung Hom station via East Kowloon, with six new intermediate stations, including interchanges with the Kwun Tong line at Diamond Hill and Ho Man Tin, an additional interchange with the East Rail line at Hung Hom, and a new station, Hin Keng, serving Sha Tin. The extension will connect to the West Rail line at Hung Hom and continue on to Tuen Mun station in the northwest New Territories via the current West Rail line and its 2009 extension to Hung Hom). Due to various delays, the new line opened only as far as Kai Tak on 14 February 2020, with the remaining section to Hung Hom to begin service on 27 June 2021.

After the opening of the Tuen Ma line Phase 1 on 14 February 2020, the Ma On Shan line became part of the new line with three new stations in Hin Keng, Diamond Hill and Kai Tak. While technically still in operation, the name "Ma On Shan line" is no longer in use.

Both the SP1900 and East West line C-trains in eight-car formations will run on the conjoined line, now known as the Tuen Ma line, resulting in the platforms of the Ma On Shan line being lengthened from 2014 to 2016 to accommodate the longer trains and automatic platform gates by Gilgen Door Systems (part of Nabtesco Corporation) retrofitted on all platforms from 2014 to 2017. The SelTrac IS signalling system will also be upgraded to SelTrac CBTC, which equips the extension.

Stations
The following is a list of the stations on the Ma On Shan line.

Gallery

See also
 Ma On Shan (town)

References

External links

Official Website of the MTR
Official Website of Tuen Ma Line
Official Website of MTR's rail services

 
MTR lines
Sha Tin District
Ma On Shan
Railway lines opened in 2004
Standard gauge railways in Hong Kong
Regional rail in Hong Kong
Viaducts in Hong Kong